Holcocephala is a genus of robber flies in the family Asilidae. There are at least 40 described species in Holcocephala.

Species
These 40 species belong to the genus Holcocephala:

 Holcocephala abdominalis (Say, 1823) i c g b
 Holcocephala affinis Bellardi, 1861 c g
 Holcocephala agalla Walker, 1849 c g
 Holcocephala analis (Macquart, 1846) c
 Holcocephala bechyneorum Ayala, 1982 c g
 Holcocephala calva (Loew, 1872) i c g b
 Holcocephala coriacea (Wiedemann, 1821) c g
 Holcocephala curvicosta Carrera, 1958 c g
 Holcocephala deltoidea (Bellardi, 1861) c g
 Holcocephala dimidiata Hermann, 1924 c g
 Holcocephala divisa (Walker, 1860) c
 Holcocephala fernandezi Ayala, 1982 c g
 Holcocephala fimbriata Hermann, 1924 c g
 Holcocephala fusca Bromley, 1951 i c g b
 Holcocephala indigena Scarbrough & Perez-Gelabert, 2006 c g
 Holcocephala inornata (Rondani, 1848) c g
 Holcocephala luteipes Hermann, 1924 c g
 Holcocephala macula (Rondani, 1848) c g
 Holcocephala matteii Ayala, 1982 c g
 Holcocephala minuta (Bellardi, 1861) c g
 Holcocephala mogiana Carrera, 1955 c g
 Holcocephala monticola Ayala, 1982 c g
 Holcocephala nigrita (Fabricius, 1805) c g
 Holcocephala nitida (Wiedemann, 1830) c
 Holcocephala nodosipes (Enderlein, 1914) c g
 Holcocephala obscuripennis Enderlein, 1914 c g
 Holcocephala oculata (Fabricius, 1805) c g
 Holcocephala pardalina Hermann, 1924 c g
 Holcocephala pectinata Carrera, 1955 c g
 Holcocephala pennipes Hermann, 1924 c g
 Holcocephala peruviana Hermann, 1924 c g
 Holcocephala rufithorax (Wiedemann, 1828) c g
 Holcocephala scopifer (Schiner, 1868) c
 Holcocephala spinipes Hermann, 1924 c g
 Holcocephala stylata Pritchard, 1938 c g
 Holcocephala tijucana (Carrera, 1958) c g
 Holcocephala uruguayensis Lynch Arribalzaga, 1882 c g
 Holcocephala vallestris Ayala, 1982 c g
 Holcocephala vicina (Macquart, 1838) c
 Holcocephala vittata (Walker, 1836) c g

Data sources: i = ITIS, c = Catalogue of Life, g = GBIF, b = Bugguide.net

References

Further reading

External links

 
 
 

Asilidae
Asilidae genera